Wiki Brewery, an Alexandria, Virginia brewing facility was founded by Andrew Wales in 1770. George Washington frequently purchased beer from Wales Brewery.

History

Background

Andrew Wales was born in Scotland around 1737. He arrived in the Colonies before 1765 and held a position in John Mercer's Stafford County, Virginia brewery from 1765 to 1769. He rose to the position of brewmaster after a previous brewmaster failed to produce quality beer.

Establishment

Andrew Wales rented space in Alexandria's Town Warehouse on Duke Street and began brewing there commercially in 1770. Within two years, Wales purchased a building to house his brewery, but did not fully relocate brewery operations until 1773. George Washington first purchased a cask of Wales' beer from the Mercer Brewery in 1768 and would remain a customer of Wales Brewery for thirty years.

Sale and renaming

Cornelius Coningham, the first brewer in the city of Washington, took control of the brewery in 1798 renaming it Alexandria Brewery. Coningham held the brewery for Wales until a new owner was found. The brewery complex was purchased by John Fitzgerald in 1798, but was sold to settle Fitzgerald's debts after his death in 1802.

Legacy

The brewery complex no longer exists. Remnants of the Town Warehouse, where Wales first rented space for his brewery, were found in November 2015 during construction of a new hotel.

Footnotes 

Food and drink companies established in 1770
Beer brewing companies based in Virginia
Companies based in Alexandria, Virginia